Tomasz Księżyc (born April 20, 1974 in Kraków) is a Polish footballer who plays as a defender for Puszcza Niepołomice.

Career

Club
In December 2010, he joined Puszcza Niepołomice on one and a half contract.

References

External links
 

1974 births
Living people
Polish footballers
Wawel Kraków players
MKS Cracovia (football) players
Hutnik Nowa Huta players
Szczakowianka Jaworzno
Podbeskidzie Bielsko-Biała players
Górnik Wieliczka players
Kolejarz Stróże players
Puszcza Niepołomice players
Footballers from Kraków
Association football defenders